Vyshka is a rural locality (a selo) in Rynkovsky Selsoviet, Limansky District, Astrakhan Oblast, Russia. The population was 189 as of 2010. There are 4 streets.

Geography 
Vyshka is located 53 km southeast of Liman (the district's administrative centre) by road. Rynok is the nearest rural locality.

References 

Rural localities in Limansky District